Beerbohm is a surname. Notable people with the surname include:

Constance Beerbohm, oldest daughter of Julius Ewald Edward Beerbohm (1811–1892)
Elisabeth Jungmann, Lady Beerbohm (1894–1958), interpreter and the secretary, literary executor
Felicity Beerbohm Tree, Lady Cory-Wright (1895–1978), daughter of Herbert
Florence Kahn, Lady Beerbohm
Sir Herbert Beerbohm Tree, born Herbert Draper Beerbohm (1852–1917), English actor and manager
Julius Beerbohm (1854–1906), travel-writer, engineer and explorer, son of Julius Ewald Edward Beerbohm
Lyle Beerbohm, American professional mixed martial artist
Sir (Henry Maximilian) "Max" Beerbohm (1872–1956), English parodist and caricaturist

See also 
Beerbohm family
Bierbaum

Germanic-language surnames